Journal of the Philosophy of History (JPH) is a peer-reviewed academic philosophy journal focusing on the philosophy of history and historical theory published three times a year, by Brill Publishers. Journal of the Philosophy of History is edited and institutionally anchored at the Centre for Philosophical Studies of History of the University of Oulu, Finland. It is one of a few journals with an explicit focus on philosophical issues pertaining to history and historiography. The journal contains original research articles, book reviews, and extended review essays.

JPH was founded in 2007 by the Dutch philosopher of history Frank Ankersmit. Since 2017 it is under the editorship of Jouni-Matti Kuukkanen, a philosopher of history and science and director of the Centre for Philosophical Studies of History at the University of Oulu. The editorial board consists of Giuseppina D'Oro (Keele University), Allan Megill (University of Virginia), Marek Tamm (Tallinn University), and Herman Paul (Leiden University). Eugen Zeleňák (Catholic University in Ruzomberok) is review editor, and Georg Gangl (University of Oulu) acts as editorial assistant.

The journal is indexed in Scopus and Web of Science.

See also
Philosophy of History
Historiography
List of philosophy journals

References

External links 
 
 Centre for Philosophical Studies of History at the University of Oulu

Philosophy of history
Philosophy journals
Philosophy of science
Philosophy of social science
Brill Publishers academic journals